John Henderson (8 March 1747 – 3 December 1785) was an English actor, known as "The Bath Roscius", who inherited David Garrick's mantle as the greatest Shakesperean actor.

From 1772 until 1778 he performed as part of the company at the Old Orchard Street Theatre in Bath.

Notes and references

Sources

Further reading

1747 births
1785 deaths
18th-century British dramatists and playwrights
English dramatists and playwrights
English theatre managers and producers
Actor-managers
English male Shakespearean actors
18th-century English male actors
Place of birth missing
Place of death missing
English male stage actors
English male dramatists and playwrights
18th-century English male writers